Greatest Hits: Decade #1 is the first greatest hits double album by American country music singer Carrie Underwood, released on December 9, 2014, by Arista Nashville. The release contains every single from Underwood's first four studio albums: Some Hearts (2005), Carnival Ride (2007), Play On (2009), and Blown Away (2012), except "Some Hearts" from its album of the same name. Two newly recorded songs were included: "Something in the Water" and "Little Toy Guns". The album also contains four additional tracks.

The compilation debuted at number four on the Billboard 200 and at number one on the Top Country Albums charts, and set several records upon release, including having the biggest sales debut for a hits collection in any genre of music in more than six years and the biggest first-week sales for a female hits album in any genre in over nine years. It went on to become the largest selling greatest hits album of 2015, and has been certified Platinum by the RIAA.

The album's first single, "Something in the Water" won the 2014 Grammy Award for Best Country Solo Performance. The following year, "Little Toy Guns" was nominated for the same award.

Background

On September 26, 2014, during an appearance on The Today Show, Underwood announced her plans to release Greatest Hits: Decade #1 on December 9, 2014, as a celebration of her tenth anniversary of winning the fourth season of American Idol. The same day, she announced the compilation's first single, "Something in the Water". About the content of the compilation, Underwood said "I don’t think it would be quite as exciting if I didn’t have something new for the album". The compilation contains 25 tracks in two discs, 19 of which are previously released singles. It comes with two newly recorded songs, "Something in the Water" and "Little Toy Guns". It also features four additional tracks, including her previously unreleased, live version of "How Great Thou Art" with Vince Gill, a song they performed together for the ACM Presents: Girls’ Night Out TV concert. About including "How Great Thou Art" on her collection, Underwood stated: "'How Great Thou Art' kind of took on a life of its own. I hear people all the time come up to me and tell me, 'I love that, I look at it online all the time', so I thought it was important to make that available on an album. That was a really amazing moment – I think for myself and for Vince – and we felt it". The other three additional tracks are songwriting worktape versions of "So Small", "Last Name" and "Mama's Song". On including these songwriting worktapes, Underwood said "I wanted to do something different with extras, so we’re including three worktapes that were recorded the day we wrote the songs – which I think is pretty special".

Singles
"Something in the Water" was released as the first single from the compilation. The song was written by Underwood along with Chris DeStefano and Brett James, and produced by Underwood's longtime producer Mark Bright. It also has a sample of "Amazing Grace" at the end of the song, sung by Underwood. It became a crossover success, having topped the Billboard Hot Country Songs chart for seven weeks and the Hot Christian Songs chart for twenty six consecutive weeks. It also reached No. 24 on the Billboard Hot 100 chart. On August 10, 2015, "Something in the Water" was certified Platinum by RIAA. At the 57th Grammy Awards, the song won the Grammy award for Best Country Solo Performance.

In February 2015,"Little Toy Guns" was released as the second single from the compilation. The song was released to country radio on February 16, 2015. The track peaked at number six on Billboard's Hot Country Songs, number two on the Country Airplay Chart and number 47 on the Hot 100. On August 10, 2015, "Little Toy Guns" was certified Gold by RIAA. The song was nominated for Best Country Solo Performance at the 58th Grammy Awards.

Commercial performance
Greatest Hits: Decade Number #1 sold 103,000 copies including pure albums, on-demand streaming and digital tracks sold in its first week, debuting at number four on the Billboard 200 and at number one on the Top Country Albums charts, thus setting several records upon release. It is the biggest sales debut for a hits collection in any genre of music in more than six years, when Frank Sinatra's Nothing But the Best arrived in May 2008. It is the biggest first-week sales for a female hits album in any genre in over nine years, when Reba McEntire's Reba #1's opened in November 2005. It is also the biggest debut sales week for a country best-of title since Toby Keith's 35 Biggest Hits debuted in May 2008. It also logs the biggest sales week for a best-of since Whitney Houston's Whitney: The Greatest Hits shifted 112,000 on the chart dated March 17, 2012. The album was certified Platinum on January 8, 2016 (500,000 copies shipped but counted as a million for double album). Greatest Hits: Decade #1 became the largest-selling greatest hits album of 2015.  The album has sold 564,300 copies as of April 2017.

In terms of chart positions, on the Billboard 200, Greatest Hits: Decade #1 has the highest ranking for a newly released greatest hits album since Kenny Chesney's Greatest Hits II debuted and peaked at number three in May 2009. It's the highest-charting greatest hits album since Frank Sinatra's 2008 collection Nothing but the Best rebounded to number three in August 2012. On the Top Country Albums chart, Underwood scored her fifth consecutive number one bow, of five career releases, as Greatest Hits: Decade #1 debuted atop the chart. She is only the second artist to arrive with five number one debuts on Top Country Albums (which premiered in 1964), with Miranda Lambert being the other one. Underwood is first female artist to debut at number one on the Top Country Albums chart with a greatest hits album since Shania Twain's Greatest Hits had 11 weeks on top from November 2004 to January 2005. In the United Kingdom, the collection debuted at number two on the Country Compilation Album chart and a year later it reached number one, on November 13, 2015.

Critical reception

Reviewing for AllMusic, Stephen Thomas Erlewine said "the 21 singles – which are supplemented by three demos that reveal Carrie works well in a stark setting, too – are of a piece, expertly constructed post-Shania and Faith Hill country-pop proving that Underwood is the new-millennial heir to their throne." Robert Christgau was less enthusiastic in Vice. He highlighted "Mama's Song", "Two Black Cadillacs", and "Remind Me", while briefly summarizing the album with the following commentary on Underwood: "Big enough to command great songs, even to put her hand to a feminist few, but not big enough to trust her indoor voice".

Track listing

Personnel
Credits adapted from AllMusic

Musicians

 Robert Bailey Jr. – background vocals
 Eddie Bayers – drums
 Joe Chemay – background vocals
 Perry Coleman – background vocals
 Eric Darken – percussion
 Chris DeStefano – background vocals
 Stuart Duncan – fiddle, acoustic guitar, mandolin
 Steve Gibson – acoustic guitar
 Vince Gill – vocals on "How Great Thou Art"
 Kenny Greenberg – electric guitar
 Vicki Hampton – background vocals
 Brett James – background vocals
 John Barlow Jarvis – piano
 Charlie Judge – synthesizer
 Hillary Lindsey – background vocals
 Chris McHugh – drums
 Brent Mason – electric guitar
 Jimmy Nichols – piano
 Brad Paisley – duet vocals and electric guitar on "Remind Me"
 Kim Parent – background vocals
 Larry Paxton – bass guitar
 Jimmie Lee Sloas – bass guitar
 Edgar Struble – acoustic guitar, keyboards
 Ilya Toshinsky – banjo, acoustic guitar
 Randy Travis – duet vocals on "I Told You So"
 Carrie Underwood – lead vocals, background vocals
 Tommy White – steel guitar

Technical personnel

 Adam Ayan – mastering
 Derek Branson – digital editing, engineer, mixing
 Mark Bright – production
 Desmond Child – production
 Jeremy Cowart – photography
 Mike "Frog" Griffith – production coordination
 Charlie Judge – programming
 Frank Rogers – production
 Chris Small – assistant engineer, digital editing
 Kirsten Wines – production assistant

Charts

Weekly charts

Year-end charts

Certifications

References 

2014 greatest hits albums
Carrie Underwood albums
Arista Records compilation albums
19 Recordings compilation albums
Albums produced by Mark Bright (record producer)